Dustin Allen Peterson (born September 10, 1994) is an American professional baseball outfielder in the Philadelphia Phillies organization. He has played in Major League Baseball (MLB) for the Atlanta Braves and Detroit Tigers.

Career
Peterson attended Gilbert High School in Gilbert, Arizona. He played for the school's baseball team as a shortstop. As a senior, Peterson had a .540 batting average and hit 10 home runs with 39 runs batted in (RBIs). Peterson committed to attend Arizona State University on a college baseball scholarship to play for the Arizona State Sun Devils.

San Diego Padres
Baseball America ranked Peterson as the 44th best available prospect in the 2013 Major League Baseball Draft. The San Diego Padres selected Peterson in the second round, with the 50th overall selection, of the draft. Peterson signed with the Padres, rather than attend college. The Padres converted Peterson into a third baseman. He made his professional debut with the Arizona Padres of the Rookie-level Arizona League after he signed, and he batted .293 in 38 games. In 2014, Peterson played for the Fort Wayne TinCaps of the Class A Midwest League, where he batted .233 with ten home runs and 79 RBIs.

Atlanta Braves
On December 19, 2014, the Padres traded Peterson, Max Fried, Jace Peterson, and Mallex Smith to the Atlanta Braves in exchange for Justin Upton and Aaron Northcraft. Following the trade, Peterson began to see playing time in the outfield. Peterson spent 2015 with the Carolina Mudcats of the Class A-Advanced Carolina League, where he posted a .251 batting average with 8 home runs and 62 RBIs. In 2016, Peterson played for the Mississippi Braves of the Class AA Southern League, where he batted .282 with 12 home runs and 88 RBIs. After the 2016 season, the Braves assigned Peterson to the Salt River Rafters of the Arizona Fall League. In 2017, Peterson played for the Gwinnett Braves of the Class AAA International League, where he batted .248 with one home run and 30 RBIs in 87 games.

On May 28, 2018, Peterson's contract was selected by the Braves to replace Ronald Acuña Jr. while on the disabled list. The Braves designated Peterson for assignment on September 2, to promote Preston Tucker.

Detroit Tigers
On September 6, 2018, the Detroit Tigers claimed Peterson off of waivers. Peterson was immediately optioned to the Tigers' minor league affiliate, the Toledo Mud Hens. 

He hit .227 in the final month of the 2019 season. Peterson was outrighted off the Tigers roster on October 23, 2019. He became a minor league free agent on November 7, 2019.

Los Angeles Angels
On March 9, 2020, Peterson signed a minor league deal with the Los Angeles Angels organization. He was released by the team on May 29.

Sugar Land Skeeters
In July 2020, Peterson signed on to play for the Sugar Land Skeeters of the Constellation Energy League—a makeshift four-team independent league created as a result of the COVID-19 pandemic—for the 2020 season. He recorded a .309/.400/.500 slash line and was named team MVP.

Milwaukee Brewers
On December 15, 2020, Peterson signed a minor league contract with the Milwaukee Brewers organization. He spent the 2021 season with the Triple-A Nashville Sounds, playing in 77 games and hitting .272/.347/.416 with 9 home runs and 56 RBI. He began the 2022 season with Nashville, going 1-for-11 with four walks in three games for the team.

Philadelphia Phillies
On April 19, 2022, Peterson was traded to the Philadelphia Phillies in exchange for cash considerations. Peterson was then assigned to the Phillies' Triple-A affiliate, the Lehigh Valley IronPigs. In 102 games with the IronPigs, Peterson batted .244/.318/.379 with 9 home runs, 47 RBI, and 6 stolen bases. He elected free agency on November 10, 2022.

On January 25, 2023, Peterson re-signed with the Phillies organization on a minor league contract.

Personal life
Peterson's older brother, D. J., is also a professional baseball player, currently with the Lexington Legends of the Atlantic League of Professional Baseball.

References

External links

Living people
1994 births
People from Gilbert, Arizona
Sportspeople from the Phoenix metropolitan area
Baseball players from Arizona
Major League Baseball outfielders
Atlanta Braves players
Arizona League Padres players
Fort Wayne TinCaps players
Carolina Mudcats players
Detroit Tigers players
Mississippi Braves players
Salt River Rafters players
Gwinnett Braves players
Gwinnett Stripers players
Toledo Mud Hens players
Sugar Land Skeeters players
Nashville Sounds players
Lehigh Valley IronPigs players